The Meldorf fibula is a Germanic spring-case-type fibula found in Meldorf, Schleswig-Holstein in 1979. Though the exact circumstances of the recovery of the fibula are unknown, it is thought to have come from a cremation grave, probably that of a woman. On typological grounds it has been dated to first half of the 1st century CE, and possibly bears the oldest runic inscription found to date.

Inscription

The inscription, found on the fibula's foot and carried out in the tremolo or assay puncture technique, remains the subject of lively debate. The controversy revolves primarily around whether the graphemes are to be understood as runic, proto-runic or Latin characters. Finds from Vimose – particularly a comb with the inscription harja dated to ca. 160 CE – are generally considered to be the oldest runic artifacts yet found. If the inscription on the Meldorf fibula is runic, then it has far-reaching implications regarding the question as to the origin and development of the Elder Futhark.

Interpretations

Düwel and Gebühr (1981) suggest that the inscription contains four runes, reading (left to right) , which they interpret as meaning "for the spouse" or "mater familias". This interpretation has been widely criticised as epigraphically and linguistically irregular, however (Odenstedt 1989, Mees 1997).

Düwel's interpretation gained renewed attention with the discovery of Wijnaldum B, a small golden pendant of possibly Mediterranean origin dated to ca. 600 CE, in Leeuwarden, Friesland in 1990. Looijenga (2021:383, n.7) has since withdrawn her reading of the inscription, however, seeing it now as only featuring meaningless scratches.

Odenstedt (1989) interprets the inscription as being composed in the Latin alphabet, reading (right to left) , which he translates as a personal name, the gender of which remains uncertain; if feminine "for Ida", if masculine, "for Iddo". Seebold (1994) also agrees with this interpretation.

Mees (1997), like Düwel, interprets the inscription as runic, but instead reads (right to left) , which he translates as "to the (rune-)master". 

The fibula is kept in Gottorp, Schleswig-Holstein.

See also
Negau helmet

External links
Drawing originally from Düwel/Gebühr (1981) (Handbok i norrøn filologi)

References
Anderson, Carl Edlund (2005); The Runic System as a Reinterpretation of Classical Influences and as an Expression of Scandinavian Cultural Affiliation 
Düwel, Klaus (1981), The Meldorf Fibula and the Origin of Runic Writing in Michigan Germanic Studies no. 7, pp. 8–14.
Düwel, Klaus/Gebühr, Michael (1981); Die Fibel von Meldorf und die Anfänge der Runenschrift in Zeitschrift für deutsches Altertum und deutsche Literatur no. 110, pp. 159–75.
Düwel, Klaus (1994), ed., Runische Schriftkultur in ERGA no. 10, Berlin, New York.
Düwel, Klaus (2001); Runenkunde, Weimar: J. B. Metzger, pp. 23–4, 87. 
Hines, John, and Nelleke IJssennagger-van der Pluijm (2021) eds., Frisians of the Early Middle Ages, Woodbridge: Boydell.
Looijenga, Tineke (1997); Runes Around the North Sea and on the Continent AD 150-700, Groningen: SSG Uitgeverij; pg. 129, 186. 
Looijenga, Tineke (2021); Runic literacy in north-west Europe, with a focus on Frisia, in Hines and IJssennagger-van der Pluijm (2021), pp. 375-400. 
Mees, Bernard (1997); A New Interpretation of the Meldorf Fibula Inscription in Zeitschrift für deutsches Altertum und deutsche Literatur no. 126, pp. 131–39.
Odenstedt, Bengt (1989); Further Reflections on the Meldorf Inscription in Zeitschrift für deutsches Altertum und deutsche Literatur no. 118, pp. 77–85.
Orel, Vladimir (2003). A Handbook of Germanic Etymology. Leiden: Brill Publishers. pg. 173. .
Seebold, Elmar (1994); Die sprachliche Deutung und Einordnung der archaischen Runeninschriften in Düwel (1994), pp. 56–94.

Elder Futhark inscriptions